Sir Henri-Elzéar Taschereau,  (October 7, 1836 – April 14, 1911) was a Canadian jurist and the fourth Chief Justice of Canada.

Career
Taschereau was born in his family's seigneurial manor house at Sainte-Marie-de-la-Beauce, Lower Canada to Pierre-Elzéar Taschereau and Catherine Hénédine Dionne. Tashereau attended the Université Laval and was called to the Bar of Quebec in 1857. That same year he married Marie-Antoinette de Lotbiniere Harwood (d. 1896), daughter of Robert Unwin Harwood, and they were the parents of seven children. He married his second wife, Marie-Louise Panet, in 1897 and fathered three more children.

He practiced law in Quebec City and entered politics in 1861 when he was elected to the Legislative Assembly of what was then the Province of Canada where he opposed Canadian Confederation. He was appointed a judge of the Quebec Superior Court in 1871 and to the Supreme Court of Canada in 1878 following the retirement of Jean-Thomas Taschereau (see below), and also taught law part-time at the University of Ottawa. He was made a knight bachelor on 14 August 1902, after the honour had been announced in the 1902 Coronation Honours list published on 26 June 1902. In November 1902 he became Chief Justice serving for four years until his retirement in 1906. He became a member of the British Privy Council in 1904, which entitled him to sit on the Judicial Committee of the Privy Council.

Family
Taschereau was the great, great grandson of Thomas-Jacques Taschereau, the patriarch of the family in Canada. He was first-cousin once-removed to the brothers Elzéar Alexandre Cardinal Taschereau and Supreme Court Justice Jean-Thomas Taschereau. Jean-Thomas's son Louis-Alexandre would serve as Premier of Quebec. His grandson Robert Taschereau would also serve as Chief Justice of Canada.

Henri-Elzéar Taschereau married at Vaudreuil, Quebec May 27, 1857, to Marie Antoinette Harwood, daughter of the Hon. R. U. Harwood, Seigneur of Vaudreuil, and his wife, Marie Louise Josephte Chartier de Lotbiniere. The couple had seven children. She died at Ottawa, June 2, 1896. Her remains were interred in the parish church of Vaudreuil.

Henri-Elzéar Taschereau married at Ottawa, March 22, 1897 his second wife Marie Louise Panet, daughter of Charles Panet, Clerk of Private Bills, House of Commons, Ottawa, and his wife, Euphemie Chateauvert. Marie Louise was born in Ottawa, February 29, 1868, and received her education at the Convent of the Sacred Heart (Grey Nuns) in Ottawa. The couple lived at 363 Theodore Street, Ottawa. The couple had two sons. Charles Elzear de Montarville Taschereau was born in Ottawa on October 5, 1898. Henri Edouard Panet Taschereau was born at Ottawa, August 9, 1902.

Further reading

External links
 Supreme Court of Canada Biography

References

Henri-Elzéar
Chief justices of Canada
Justices of the Supreme Court of Canada
Lawyers in Quebec
Canadian legal scholars
Canadian members of the Privy Council of the United Kingdom
Canadian Knights Bachelor
1836 births
1911 deaths
Members of the Judicial Committee of the Privy Council
Members of the Legislative Assembly of the Province of Canada from Canada East
Université Laval alumni